The 2007 MAAC men's basketball tournament was held March 2–5 at The Arena at Harbor Yard in Bridgeport, CT.

Fourth-seeded Niagara defeated  in the championship game, 83–79, to win their first MAAC men's basketball tournament.

The Purple Eagles received an automatic bid to the 2007 NCAA tournament.

Format
All ten of the conference's members participated in the tournament field. They were seeded based on regular season conference records.

Bracket

References

MAAC men's basketball tournament
2006–07 Metro Atlantic Athletic Conference men's basketball season
2007 in sports in Connecticut
College basketball tournaments in Connecticut
Sports competitions in Bridgeport, Connecticut